Vranjevci is a South Slavic Toponym. It may refer to:

Vranjevci, an inhabited place in the Novaci Municipality, in southern Republic of Macedonia.
Vranjevc, the largest neighborhood of Pristina, the capital of Kosovo.